Anne de Guigné (25 April 1911 – 14 January 1922) was a young French girl who is being considered for sainthood by the Roman Catholic Church.

Life 
Anne was the oldest of four siblings. Her parents were wealthy and prominent.  Anne's father was Count Jacques de Guigné, second lieutenant in the 13th Battalion, Chambéry of Chasseurs Alpins. Anne's mother was born Antoinette de Charette on 19 September 1886, the great-niece of François de Charette, the well-known general who led the soldiers of France in the Battle of Patay. Anne's maternal great-grandmother, Louise de Bourbon, comtesse de Vierzon was the natural child of Ferdinand Duke de Berry, the second son of French King Charles X, making her a direct descendant of Louis XIII, XIV and XV as well; her maternal grandmother, Francoise Eulalie Marie Madeleine de Bourbon-Busset, was a direct descendant of the sixth son of King Louis IX of France, Robert, Count of Clermont.

Anne was the oldest of 4 children, and up until the age of 4, was seen as a jealous and proud girl. On 29 July 1915 Anne's father died leading an attack against the Germans in World War I. When Anne's mother told Anne, she was a changed child. With mature understanding, she told her mother that her father was up with the angels. After that day, Anne was no longer rude and jealous. Instead she worked hard to please her mother, and became very religious.

Death
Anne began to have headaches due to spinal pain, but still did her work in school. She slipped into a coma, and the doctor discovered that she had meningitis. At 5:25 am on Saturday 14 January 1922, Anne died peacefully.

Cause for beatification
She was declared Venerable on 3 March 1990 by Pope John Paul II.

References

External links
Official website
Catholic Tradition biography
Picture of Anne
Picture of Anne
The Real Presence biography
Russian article about Anne de Guigné

1911 births
1922 deaths
20th-century venerated Christians
Roman Catholic child venerables
Neurological disease deaths in France
Infectious disease deaths in France
Deaths from meningitis
French children
French untitled nobility
French Roman Catholics
People from Haute-Savoie
Venerated Catholics by Pope John Paul II